The Green Party of New Mexico (GPNM) is the state party organization of the Green Party of the United States for New Mexico. It is currently qualified as a minor party and is noted for its solid following.

See also
History of New Mexico

References

External links
 

Political parties in New Mexico
New Mexico Greens
New Mexico